San Pablo is a district of the Nandayure canton, in the Guanacaste province of Costa Rica. Located on the Nicoya Peninsula.

Geography 
San Pablo has an area of  km² and an elevation of  metres.

Villages
Administrative center of the district is the village of San Pablo.

Other villages in the district are Canjel, Canjelito, Corozal Oeste, Chamarro, Isla Berrugate, Pavones, Puerto Thiel and San Pablo Viejo.

Demographics 

For the 2011 census, San Pablo had a population of  inhabitants.

Transportation

Road transportation 
The district is covered by the following road routes:
 National Route 21
 National Route 623

References 

Districts of Guanacaste Province
Populated places in Guanacaste Province